Aarón Ñíguez Esclápez (born 26 April 1989) is a Spanish professional footballer who plays as a winger.

A Valencia youth graduate, he was capped by Spain at various youth levels, and competed mainly in Segunda División during his career, also having brief abroad spells in Greece, Scotland, Portugal and Malaysia.

Club career

Early career
Born in Elche, Alicante, Valencian Community, Ñíguez was a product of Valencia CF's youth system. He made his first-team debut on 5 December 2006 against A.S. Roma in the group stage of the UEFA Champions League, starting and playing 27 minutes in the 1–0 away loss, and spent his first professional year with the reserves in the Segunda División B, featuring regularly but suffering relegation.

After starting the 2007–08 season on loan with Segunda División side Xerez CD, Ñíguez switched in the January transfer window to Iraklis Thessaloniki F.C. from Greece. He scored his first goal for the team on 16 March 2008, through a penalty kick in a 1–0 win over Panionios F.C. after his acrobatic bicycle kick was blocked by an opponent's hand.

Rangers
Ñíguez signed a two-year contract with Scottish Premier League club Rangers on 13 August 2008, with an option to buy. He made his official debut in the 7–1 defeat of Hamilton Academical on 6 December, coming on as a second-half substitute and immediately creating a goal for compatriot Nacho Novo. He scored his first competitive goal for his new team in a Scottish Cup tie against Third Division side Forfar Athletic, and was booked for removing his shirt in celebration. His second also came in the domestic cup, against Hamilton from the penalty spot, in what was his first start.

On 7 June 2009, it was announced that the two-year loan would be terminated, and Ñíguez returned to Valencia late in the month.

Return to Spain
On 30 August 2009, still on loan from Valencia, Ñíguez joined RC Celta de Vigo of division two, playing less than one third of the matches during the campaign due to a serious anterior cruciate ligament injury. For 2010–11, also on loan, he moved to another club in that tier, Recreativo de Huelva.

In July 2011, Ñíguez cut ties with Valencia and signed a five-year deal with another side in the second division, UD Almería. On 7 January 2013, just hours after being released by the Andalusians, he joined another team in the same league, Elche CF, until June 2017. He appeared in 16 games for the latter, which were promoted to La Liga after a 25-year absence.

Ñíguez made his debut in the Spanish top flight on 19 August 2013, starting and being booked in a 3–0 away loss against Rayo Vallecano. On 31 October he scored his first goal in the competition, in a 2–2 draw at Athletic Bilbao.

On 12 August 2015, Ñíguez left Elche.

Braga
Ñíguez moved to a third foreign league in late August 2015, signing for S.C. Braga of the Portuguese Primeira Liga. After only 15 appearances in all competitions, he left the club.

Tenerife and Oviedo
On 30 August 2016, Ñíguez signed a one-year contract with CD Tenerife, returning to Spain and its second tier. The following 3 July, he agreed to a two-year deal with Real Oviedo of the same league.

A regular starter with the latter, Ñíguez lost his starting spot after the arrival of Yoel Bárcenas, and terminated his link on 18 November 2018.

Johor Darul Ta'zim
On 19 November 2018, Ñíguez joined Johor Darul Ta'zim F.C. on a five-year contract. On 21 February 2019, however, he was released and replaced by Leandro Velázquez.

Málaga and Elche return
Ñíguez returned to the Spanish second division on 4 March 2020, signing with Málaga CF until 30 June. On 1 September, after Elche achieved promotion to the top flight, he rejoined the club after activating a clause in his previous contract.

International career
Ñíguez played in the 2006 UEFA European Championship for the Spain under-17 team, finishing as the fourth top scorer in the tournament with three goals. He was also a key member of the under-19 side that won the following year's European Championship, beating Greece in the final.

On 18 November 2008, Ñíguez made his debut for the under-21s, in a 4–1 friendly loss to Portugal.

Personal life
Ñíguez came from a football family: his father, José Antonio, played several years with Elche – including the 1984–85 season in La Liga – as a striker.

His older brother, Jonathan (another midfielder), was also brought up at Valencia, spending almost his entire senior career in the lower leagues. The youngest, Saúl, was brought up at Atlético Madrid.

Career statistics

Club

Honours
Braga
Taça de Portugal: 2015–16

Johor Darul Takzim
Malaysia Charity Shield: 2019

Spain U19
UEFA European Under-19 Championship: 2007

Spain U20
Mediterranean Games: 2009

References

External links

CiberChe biography and stats 

1989 births
Living people
Spanish footballers
Footballers from Elche
Association football wingers
La Liga players
Segunda División players
Segunda División B players
Segunda Federación players
Valencia CF Mestalla footballers
Valencia CF players
Xerez CD footballers
RC Celta de Vigo players
Recreativo de Huelva players
UD Almería players
Elche CF players
CD Tenerife players
Real Oviedo players
Málaga CF players
CF La Nucía players
CD Eldense footballers
Super League Greece players
Iraklis Thessaloniki F.C. players
Scottish Premier League players
Rangers F.C. players
Primeira Liga players
S.C. Braga players
Malaysia Super League players
Johor Darul Ta'zim F.C. players
Spain youth international footballers
Spain under-21 international footballers
Competitors at the 2009 Mediterranean Games
Mediterranean Games medalists in football
Mediterranean Games gold medalists for Spain
Spanish expatriate footballers
Expatriate footballers in Greece
Expatriate footballers in Scotland
Expatriate footballers in Portugal
Expatriate footballers in Malaysia
Spanish expatriate sportspeople in Greece
Spanish expatriate sportspeople in Scotland
Spanish expatriate sportspeople in Portugal
Spanish expatriate sportspeople in Malaysia